Forsyth County is located in the northwest Piedmont of the U.S. state of North Carolina. As of the 2020 census, the population was 382,590, making it the fourth-most populous county in North Carolina. Its county seat is Winston-Salem. Forsyth County is part of the Winston-Salem, NC, Metropolitan Statistical Area, which is also included in the Greensboro-Winston-Salem-High Point, NC, Combined Statistical Area. Portions of Forsyth County are in the Yadkin Valley wine region.

History
The county was formed in 1849 from Stokes County. It was named for Colonel Benjamin Forsyth, who was killed in the War of 1812.

Geography

The northeast section of Forsyth County, including Belews Creek and parts of Rural Hall, Walkertown, and Kernersville, is drained by tributaries of the Dan River. A small portion of Kernersville is in the Cape Fear River basin. Most of the county is drained by tributaries of the Yadkin River, which forms the western boundary of the county. The lowest elevation in the county is 660 feet, on the Yadkin River at the southwest corner of the county. The highest is 1100 feet, at a point just off Jefferson Church Road on the outskirts of King, immediately south of the county line.

State and local protected areas/sites 
 Cascades Preserve (part)
 Emily Allen Wildflower Preserve
 Historic Bethabara Park
 Old Salem Museums & Gardens
 Shell-Shaped Shell Station
 Tanglewood Park

Major water bodies 
 Abbotts Creek
 Belews Creek
 Belews Lake
 Beaver Dam Creek
 Brushy Creek
 Blanket Creek
 Buffalo Creek
 Crooked Run Creek
 Lick Creek
 Little Creek
 Little Yadkin River
 Mill Creek
 Muddy Creek
 Old Field Creek
 Reedy Fork
 Salem Creek
 Silas Creek
 South Fork Muddy Creek
 Yadkin River

Adjacent counties
 Stokes County - north
 Rockingham County - northeast
 Guilford County - east
 Davidson County - south
 Davie County - southwest
 Yadkin County - west
 Surry County - northwest

Major highways
 
  (Designated section from I-40 to county line with Guilford County)
  (Future Loop around Winston Salem)
 
  (Concurrency with US 421)
 
 
 
 
 
 
 
 
  (Component highway for I-74)
 
 
 
  (Future component highway for I-274)

Major infrastructure
 Amtrak Thruway (Winston-Salem)
 Smith Reynolds Airport

Demographics

2020 census

As of the 2020 United States census, there were 382,590 people, 148,151 households, and 90,837 families residing in the county.

2000 census
As of the census of 2000, there were 306,067 people, 123,851 households, and 81,741 families residing in the county. The population density was 747 people per square mile (289/km2). There were 133,093 housing units, at an average density of 325 per square mile (125/km2). The racial makeup was 68.47% White, 25.61% Black or African American, 0.30% Native American, 1.04% Asian, 0.03% Pacific Islander, 3.25% from other races, and 1.30% from two or more races. 6.40% of the population were Hispanic or Latino of any race.

There were 123,851 households, out of which 30.50% had children under the age of 18 living with them, 48.90% were married couples living together, 13.50% had a female householder with no husband present, and 34.00% were non-families. 28.90% of all households were made up of individuals, and 9.30% had someone living alone who was 65 years of age or older. The average household size was 2.39, and the average family size was 2.94.

The median age was 36 years, with 23.90% under the age of 18, 9.60% from 18 to 24, 31.10% from 25 to 44, 22.80% from 45 to 64, and 12.60% who were 65 years of age or older. For every 100 females there were 91.50 males.  For every 100 females age 18 and over, there were 87.40 males.

The median household income was $42,097, and the median family income was $52,032. Males had a median income of $36,158, versus $27,319 for females. The per capita income was $23,023. About 7.90% of families and 11.00% of the population were below the poverty line, including 15.10% of those under age 18 and 9.70% of those age 65 or over.

Law and government

The Forsyth County Government Center is located at 201 North Chestnut Street in Downtown Winston-Salem. Forsyth County is a member of the regional Northwest Piedmont Council of Governments.

The Forsyth County Public Library, founded in 1906, is free for residents of Forsyth and surrounding counties, while all others must pay a small yearly fee for a library card. The library runs Adult, Children's, and Hispanic Outreach programs. Its main "Central Library" is in downtown Winston-Salem, with branches all across the county.

The Forsyth County Department of Public Health is located at 799 North Highland Avenue near downtown Winston-Salem.

Politics
Like most major urban counties, Forsyth has seen a trend towards the Democratic Party in recent elections after having voted Republican at every election between 1980 and 2004.

Education
Forsyth County is served by the Winston-Salem/Forsyth County Schools School district.

Communities

Cities
 Winston-Salem (county seat and largest city)
 High Point (mostly in Guilford County, also in Randolph County, Davidson County)
 King (mostly in Stokes County)

Towns
 Bethania
 Kernersville (partially in Guilford County)
 Lewisville
 Rural Hall
 Walkertown

Villages
 Clemmons 
 Tobaccoville (also in Stokes County)

Census-designated place
 Germanton

Townships

 Abbots Creek
 Belews Creek
 Bethania
 Broadbay
 Clemmonsville
 Kernersville
 Lewisville
 Middle Fork I
 Middle Fork II
 Old Richmond
 Old Town
 Salem Chapel
 South Fork
 Vienna
 Winston

Former township
 Middle Fork Township was split into Middle Fork I Township and Middle Fork II Township in 2003.

Unincorporated communities

 Belews Creek
 Bethabara
 Donnaha
 Dozier
 Horneytown
 Pfafftown
 Seward
 Stanleyville
 Union Cross
 Vienna

See also
 List of counties in North Carolina
 National Register of Historic Places listings in Forsyth County, North Carolina
 List of future Interstate Highways
 Adelaide Fries, author of the 1898 Forsyth County
 Arts Council of Winston-Salem Forsyth County

References

External links

 
 
 Digital Forsyth, a collaborative digitization project of historic images
 NCGenWeb Forsyth County - free genealogy resources for the county

 
Counties of Appalachia
1849 establishments in North Carolina
Populated places established in 1849